Vahram Alazan, (Vahram Gabuzian) (19 May (May 6 O.S.) 1903 in Van – 17 May 1966 in Yerevan) was an Armenian poet, writer and public activist, the First Secretary of the Writers Union of Armenia from 1933 to 1936.

A survivor of Armenian genocide, in 1915 he moved to Yerevan and since 1925 headed the Proletaric Writer's Association of Armenia. His poetic collection "Songs of Construction and Victory" became popular among the Armenian readers. Then he published "At the 60th horizon" novel. During the stalinist terror of 1937-1954 Alazan was prisoned in Siberia. In 1957 he published "Horizons" collection of philosophical poems. He was the founding director of the Perch Proshyan House-Museum in Ashtarak.

Books
"The Games of Summer", poems (1923),
"Poet's Heart", poems (1954)
"Northern Star", novel (1956),
"Memoires" (1960).

Sources
Alazan in Russian Literary Encyclopedia
Concise Armenian Encyclopedia, ed. by acad. K. Khudaverdian, Vol. 1, Yerevan, 1990, pp. 73.

References

Emigrants from the Ottoman Empire to the Russian Empire
Soviet writers
20th-century Armenian poets
Armenians from the Ottoman Empire
People from Van, Turkey
Armenian refugees
Witnesses of the Armenian genocide
1903 births
1966 deaths
Armenian male poets
Soviet Armenians